The coat of arms of the Australian Capital Territory, was granted to the Federal Capital Commission, its successors and the Australian Capital Territory by King George V in 1928. It has been used by the Australian Capital Territory as its de facto coat of arms, as the territory does not have its own coat of arms. A modified version of this coat of arms also appears on the flag of the Australian Capital Territory since 1993.

Symbolism
The various symbols of the coat of arms are explained below:
The crown symbolises Royal authority;
The mace symbolises the Parliament of Australia;
The sword symbolises the Sword of State;
The castle has three towers, symbolising the three branches of government (executive, legislature and judiciary);
The White Rose is the badge of the Duke of York who opened the old Parliament of Australia building in 1927, and who would later be crowned as King George VI.
The crowned portcullis again symbolises the legislature (parliament), this being the traditional symbol of the Palace of Westminster, which houses the Parliament of the United Kingdom;
Behind the portcullis is a gum tree which represents the growth and progress of Canberra, and the fact that it is garden city;
The supporters are the Australian black swan, representing Aboriginal Australians, and the European white mute swan, representing white settlers;
The motto is "For the King, the Law and the People", the English translation of "Pro Rege, Lege et Grege", which is found on the arms of the city of Perth, Scotland, as well as those of the Ponsonby family.

History
The creation of the Coat of Arms of the Australian Capital Territory originated from a request by the Commonwealth Department of Defence to the Commonwealth Department of Home Affairs and Territories in July 1927. The request was made so that the Coat of Arms could be used on the newly commissioned ship, HMAS Canberra. In August 1927, the Federal Capital Commissioners (FCC) announced a competition to design a Coat of Arms for the FCC and for the Australian Capital Territory.

The Federal Capital Commission (FCC) commenced the competition to design a coat of arms for the Australian Capital Territory in 1928.

In April 1928, the design of one Mr C. R. Wylie, having won the competition, was sent to the College of Arms, in London, for approval. The coat of arms at this stage did not include a motto.  After minor adjustments, King George V granted the design in pursuance of a Royal Warrant dated 8 October 1928. The College of Arms issued the official exemplification (artistic rendition) and blazon (description) on 7 November 1928, along with a crest.

New Coat of Arms of the Australian Capital Territory
In March 2019, following the adoption of the Southern Brush-tailed Rock-wallaby as the mammal emblem for the territory, the Australian Capital Territory Legislative Assembly is also considering the idea of a separate new ACT Coat of Arms. It is intended that the new ACT coat of arms be created in addition to the existing coat of arms.

See also
Australian heraldry

References

External links
 ACT Flags and Emblems
 Archives of ACT

Australian Capital Territory
Australian Capital Territory
Australian Capital Territory
Australian Capital Territory
Australian Capital Territory
Australian Capital Territory